Deuterium (or hydrogen-2, symbol  or D, also known as heavy hydrogen) is one of two stable isotopes of hydrogen (the other being protium, or hydrogen-1). The nucleus of a deuterium atom, called a deuteron, contains one proton and one neutron, whereas the far more common protium has no neutrons in the nucleus. Deuterium has a natural abundance in Earth's oceans of about one atom of deuterium among every 6,420 atoms of hydrogen (see heavy water). Thus deuterium accounts for approximately 0.0156% by number (0.0312% by mass) of all the naturally occurring hydrogen in the oceans, while protium accounts for more than 99.98%. The abundance of deuterium changes slightly from one kind of natural water to another (see Vienna Standard Mean Ocean Water). (Tritium is yet another hydrogen isotope with symbol  or T. It has two neutrons, and is radioactive and far more rare than deuterium.)

The name deuterium is derived from the Greek , meaning "second", to denote the two particles composing the nucleus. Deuterium was discovered by American chemist Harold Urey in 1931. Urey and others produced samples of heavy water in which the deuterium content had been highly concentrated. The discovery of deuterium won Urey a Nobel Prize in 1934.

Deuterium is destroyed in the interiors of stars faster than it is produced. Other natural processes are thought to produce only an insignificant amount of deuterium. Nearly all deuterium found in nature was produced in the Big Bang 13.8 billion years ago, as the basic or primordial ratio of hydrogen-1 to deuterium (about 26 atoms of deuterium per million hydrogen atoms) has its origin from that time. This is the ratio found in the gas giant planets, such as Jupiter. The analysis of deuterium–protium ratios in comets found results very similar to the mean ratio in Earth's oceans (156 atoms of deuterium per million hydrogen atoms). This reinforces theories that much of Earth's ocean water is of cometary origin. The deuterium–protium ratio of the comet 67P/Churyumov–Gerasimenko, as measured by the Rosetta space probe, is about three times that of Earth water. This figure is the highest yet measured in a comet.

Deuterium–protium ratios thus continue to be an active topic of research in both astronomy and climatology.

Differences from common hydrogen (protium)

Chemical symbol

A distinct chemical symbol is used for convenience because of the isotope's common use in various scientific processes.

Spectroscopy
In quantum mechanics the energy levels of electrons in atoms depend on the reduced mass of the system of electron and nucleus. For the hydrogen atom, the role of reduced mass is most simply seen in the Bohr model of the atom, where the reduced mass appears in a simple calculation of the Rydberg constant and Rydberg equation, but the reduced mass also appears in the Schrödinger equation, and the Dirac equation for calculating atomic energy levels.

The reduced mass of the system in these equations is close to the mass of a single electron, but differs from it by a small amount about equal to the ratio of mass of the electron to the atomic nucleus. The energies of spectroscopic lines for deuterium and light hydrogen (hydrogen-1) therefore differ by the ratios of these two numbers, which is 1.000272. The wavelengths of all deuterium spectroscopic lines are shorter than the corresponding lines of light hydrogen, by a factor of 1.000272. In astronomical observation, this corresponds to a blue Doppler shift of 0.000272 times the speed of light, or 81.6 km/s.

The differences are much more pronounced in vibrational spectroscopy such as infrared spectroscopy and Raman spectroscopy, and in rotational spectra such as microwave spectroscopy because the reduced mass of the deuterium is markedly higher than that of protium. In nuclear magnetic resonance spectroscopy, deuterium has a very different NMR frequency (e.g. 61 MHz when protium is at 400 MHz) and is much less sensitive. Deuterated solvents are usually used in protium NMR to prevent the solvent from overlapping with the signal, although deuterium NMR on its own right is also possible.

Big Bang nucleosynthesis

Deuterium is thought to have played an important role in setting the number and ratios of the elements that were formed in the Big Bang. Combining thermodynamics and the changes brought about by cosmic expansion, one can calculate the fraction of protons and neutrons based on the temperature at the point that the universe cooled enough to allow formation of nuclei. This calculation indicates seven protons for every neutron at the beginning of nucleogenesis, a ratio that would remain stable even after nucleogenesis was over. This fraction was in favor of protons initially, primarily because the lower mass of the proton favored their production. As the Universe expanded, it cooled. Free neutrons and protons are less stable than helium nuclei, and the protons and neutrons had a strong energetic reason to form helium-4. However, forming helium-4 requires the intermediate step of forming deuterium.

Through much of the few minutes after the Big Bang during which nucleosynthesis could have occurred, the temperature was high enough that the mean energy per particle was greater than the binding energy of weakly bound deuterium; therefore any deuterium that was formed was immediately destroyed. This situation is known as the deuterium bottleneck. The bottleneck delayed formation of any helium-4 until the Universe became cool enough to form deuterium (at about a temperature equivalent to 100 keV). At this point, there was a sudden burst of element formation (first deuterium, which immediately fused to helium). However, very shortly thereafter, at twenty minutes after the Big Bang, the Universe became too cool for any further nuclear fusion and nucleosynthesis to occur. At this point, the elemental abundances were nearly fixed, with the only change as some of the radioactive products of Big Bang nucleosynthesis (such as tritium) decay. The deuterium bottleneck in the formation of helium, together with the lack of stable ways for helium to combine with hydrogen or with itself (there are no stable nuclei with mass numbers of five or eight) meant that an insignificant amount of carbon, or any elements heavier than carbon, formed in the Big Bang. These elements thus required formation in stars. At the same time, the failure of much nucleogenesis during the Big Bang ensured that there would be plenty of hydrogen in the later universe available to form long-lived stars, such as the Sun.

Abundance
Deuterium occurs in trace amounts naturally as deuterium gas, written 2 or D2, but most of the naturally occurring deuterium atoms in the Universe are bonded with a typical  atom to form a gas called hydrogen deuteride (HD or ). Similarly, natural water contains trace amounts of deuterated molecules, almost all as semiheavy water HDO with only one deuterium atom.

The existence of deuterium on Earth, elsewhere in the Solar System (as confirmed by planetary probes), and in the spectra of stars, is also an important datum in cosmology. Gamma radiation from ordinary nuclear fusion dissociates deuterium into protons and neutrons, and there are no known natural processes other than the Big Bang nucleosynthesis that might have produced deuterium at anything close to its observed natural abundance. Deuterium is produced by the rare cluster decay, and occasional absorption of naturally occurring neutrons by light hydrogen, but these are trivial sources. There is thought to be little deuterium in the interior of the Sun and other stars, as at these temperatures the nuclear fusion reactions that consume deuterium happen much faster than the proton-proton reaction that creates deuterium. However, deuterium persists in the outer solar atmosphere at roughly the same concentration as in Jupiter, and this has probably been unchanged since the origin of the Solar System. The natural abundance of deuterium seems to be a very similar fraction of hydrogen, wherever hydrogen is found, unless there are obvious processes at work that concentrate it.

The existence of deuterium at a low but constant primordial fraction in all hydrogen is another one of the arguments in favor of the Big Bang theory over the Steady State theory of the Universe. The observed ratios of hydrogen to helium to deuterium in the universe are difficult to explain except with a Big Bang model. It is estimated that the abundances of deuterium have not evolved significantly since their production about 13.8 billion years ago. Measurements of Milky Way galactic deuterium from ultraviolet spectral analysis show a ratio of as much as 23 atoms of deuterium per million hydrogen atoms in undisturbed gas clouds, which is only 15% below the WMAP estimated primordial ratio of about 27 atoms per million from the Big Bang. This has been interpreted to mean that less deuterium has been destroyed in star formation in the Milky Way galaxy than expected, or perhaps deuterium has been replenished by a large in-fall of primordial hydrogen from outside the galaxy. In space a few hundred light years from the Sun, deuterium abundance is only 15 atoms per million, but this value is presumably influenced by differential adsorption of deuterium onto carbon dust grains in interstellar space.

The abundance of deuterium in the atmosphere of Jupiter has been directly measured by the Galileo space probe as 26 atoms per million hydrogen atoms. ISO-SWS observations find 22 atoms per million hydrogen atoms in Jupiter. and this abundance is thought to represent close to the primordial Solar System ratio. This is about 17% of the terrestrial deuterium-to-hydrogen ratio of 156 deuterium atoms per million hydrogen atoms.

Cometary bodies such as Comet Hale-Bopp and Halley's Comet have been measured to contain relatively more deuterium (about 200 atoms D per million hydrogens), ratios which are enriched with respect to the presumed protosolar nebula ratio, probably due to heating, and which are similar to the ratios found in Earth seawater. The recent measurement of deuterium amounts of 161 atoms D per million hydrogen in Comet 103P/Hartley (a former Kuiper belt object), a ratio almost exactly that in Earth's oceans, emphasizes the theory that Earth's surface water may be largely comet-derived. Most recently the deuterium–protium (D–H) ratio of 67P/Churyumov–Gerasimenko as measured by Rosetta is about three times that of Earth water, a figure that is high. This has caused renewed interest in suggestions that Earth's water may be partly of asteroidal origin.

Deuterium has also been observed to be concentrated over the mean solar abundance in other terrestrial planets, in particular Mars and Venus.

Production

Deuterium is produced for industrial, scientific and military purposes, by starting with ordinary water—a small fraction of which is naturally-occurring heavy water—and then separating out the heavy water by the Girdler sulfide process, distillation, or other methods.

In theory, deuterium for heavy water could be created in a nuclear reactor, but separation from ordinary water is the cheapest bulk production process.

The world's leading supplier of deuterium was Atomic Energy of Canada Limited until 1997, when the last heavy water plant was shut down. Canada uses heavy water as a neutron moderator for the operation of the CANDU reactor design.

Another major producer of heavy water is India. All but one of India's atomic energy plants are pressurised heavy water plants, which use natural (i.e., not enriched) uranium. India has eight heavy water plants, of which seven are in operation. Six plants, of which five are in operation, are based on D–H exchange in ammonia gas. The other two plants extract deuterium from natural water in a process that uses hydrogen sulphide gas at high pressure.

While India is self-sufficient in heavy water for its own use, India now also exports reactor-grade heavy water.

Properties

Data for molecular deuterium 
Formula:  or 

 Density: 0.180 kg/m3 at STP (0 °C, 101325 Pa).
 Atomic weight: 2.0141017926 Da.
 Mean abundance in ocean water (from VSMOW) 155.76 ± 0.1 atoms of deuterium per million atoms of all isotopes of hydrogen (a ratio of 1 atom of deuterium per approximately 6420 atoms of all isotopes hydrogen), that is, about 0.015% of the atoms of deuterium in a sample of ocean water with all isotopes hydrogen by number

 Density:
 Liquid: 162.4 kg/m3
 Gas: 0.452 kg/m3
 Viscosity: 12.6 μPa·s at 300 K (gas phase)
 Specific heat capacity at constant pressure cp:
 Solid: 2950 J/(kg·K)
 Gas: 5200 J/(kg·K)

Physical properties 

Compared to hydrogen in its natural composition on Earth, pure deuterium (D2) has a higher melting point (18.72 K vs. 13.99 K), a higher boiling point (23.64 K vs. 20.27 K), a higher critical temperature (38.3 K vs. 32.94 K) and a higher critical pressure (1.6496 MPa vs. 1.2858 MPa).

The physical properties of deuterium compounds can exhibit significant kinetic isotope effects and other physical and chemical property differences from the protium analogs. Chemically, there are differences in bond energy and length for compounds of heavy hydrogen isotopes compared to protium, which are larger than the isotopic differences in any other element. Bonds involving deuterium and tritium are somewhat stronger than the corresponding bonds in protium, and these differences are enough to cause significant changes in biological reactions. Pharmaceutical firms are interested in the fact that deuterium is harder to remove from carbon than protium.

Deuterium can replace protium in water molecules to form heavy water (D2O), which is about 10.6% denser than normal water (so that ice made from it sinks in ordinary water). Heavy water is slightly toxic in eukaryotic animals, with 25% substitution of the body water causing cell division problems and sterility, and 50% substitution causing death by cytotoxic syndrome (bone marrow failure and gastrointestinal lining failure). Prokaryotic organisms, however, can survive and grow in pure heavy water, though they develop slowly. Despite this toxicity, consumption of heavy water under normal circumstances does not pose a health threat to humans. It is estimated that a  person might drink  of heavy water without serious consequences. Small doses of heavy water (a few grams in humans, containing an amount of deuterium comparable to that normally present in the body) are routinely used as harmless metabolic tracers in humans and animals.

Quantum properties
The deuteron has spin +1 ("triplet state") and is thus a boson. The NMR frequency of deuterium is significantly different from common light hydrogen. Infrared spectroscopy also easily differentiates many deuterated compounds, due to the large difference in IR absorption frequency seen in the vibration of a chemical bond containing deuterium, versus light hydrogen. The two stable isotopes of hydrogen can also be distinguished by using mass spectrometry.

The triplet deuteron nucleon is barely bound at EB = , and none of the higher energy states are bound. There is no such stable particle, but this virtual particle transiently exists during neutron-proton inelastic scattering, accounting for the unusually large neutron scattering cross-section of the proton.

Nuclear properties (the deuteron)

Deuteron mass and radius
The nucleus of deuterium is called a deuteron.

Like the proton radius, measurements using muonic deuterium produce a smaller result: .

Spin and energy

Deuterium is one of only five stable nuclides with an odd number of protons and an odd number of neutrons. Most odd-odd nuclei are unstable with respect to beta decay, because the decay products are even-even, and are therefore more strongly bound, due to nuclear pairing effects. Deuterium, however, benefits from having its proton and neutron coupled to a spin-1 state, which gives a stronger nuclear attraction; the corresponding spin-1 state does not exist in the two-neutron or two-proton system, due to the Pauli exclusion principle which would require one or the other identical particle with the same spin to have some other different quantum number, such as orbital angular momentum. But orbital angular momentum of either particle gives a lower binding energy for the system, primarily due to increasing distance of the particles in the steep gradient of the nuclear force. In both cases, this causes the diproton and dineutron nucleus to be unstable.

The proton and neutron making up deuterium can be dissociated through neutral current interactions with neutrinos. The cross section for this interaction is comparatively large, and deuterium was successfully used as a neutrino target in the Sudbury Neutrino Observatory experiment.

Diatomic deuterium (D2) has ortho and para nuclear spin isomers like diatomic hydrogen, but with differences in the number and population of spin states and rotational levels, which occur because the deuteron is a boson with nuclear spin equal to one.

Isospin singlet state of the deuteron
Due to the similarity in mass and nuclear properties between the proton and neutron, they are sometimes considered as two symmetric types of the same object, a nucleon. While only the proton has an electric charge, this is often negligible due to the weakness of the electromagnetic interaction relative to the strong nuclear interaction. The symmetry relating the proton and neutron is known as isospin and denoted I (or sometimes T).

Isospin is an SU(2) symmetry, like ordinary spin, so is completely analogous to it. The proton and neutron, each of which have isospin-, form an isospin doublet (analogous to a spin doublet), with a "down" state (↓) being a neutron and an "up" state (↑) being a proton. A pair of nucleons can either be in an antisymmetric state of isospin called singlet, or in a symmetric state called triplet. In terms of the "down" state and "up" state, the singlet is
, which can also be written :

This is a nucleus with one proton and one neutron, i.e. a deuterium nucleus. The triplet is

and thus consists of three types of nuclei, which are supposed to be symmetric: a deuterium nucleus (actually a highly excited state of it), a nucleus with two protons, and a nucleus with two neutrons. These states are not stable.

Approximated wavefunction of the deuteron
The deuteron wavefunction must be antisymmetric if the isospin representation is used (since a proton and a neutron are not identical particles, the wavefunction
need not be antisymmetric in general). Apart from their isospin, the two nucleons also have spin and spatial distributions of their wavefunction. The latter is symmetric if the deuteron is symmetric under parity (i.e. have an "even" or "positive" parity), and antisymmetric if the deuteron is antisymmetric under parity (i.e. have an "odd" or "negative" parity). The parity is fully determined by the total orbital angular momentum of the two nucleons: if it is even then the parity is even (positive), and if it is odd then the parity is odd (negative).

The deuteron, being an isospin singlet, is antisymmetric under nucleons exchange due to isospin, and therefore must be symmetric under the double exchange of their spin and location. Therefore, it can be in either of the following two different states:
Symmetric spin and symmetric under parity. In this case, the exchange of the two nucleons will multiply the deuterium wavefunction by (−1) from isospin exchange, (+1) from spin exchange and (+1) from parity (location exchange), for a total of (−1) as needed for antisymmetry.
Antisymmetric spin and antisymmetric under parity. In this case, the exchange of the two nucleons will multiply the deuterium wavefunction by (−1) from isospin exchange, (−1) from spin exchange and (−1) from parity (location exchange), again for a total of (−1) as needed for antisymmetry.

In the first case the deuteron is a spin triplet, so that its total spin s is 1. It also has an even parity and therefore even orbital angular momentum l ; The lower its orbital angular momentum, the lower its energy. Therefore, the lowest possible energy state has , .

In the second case the deuteron is a spin singlet, so that its total spin s is 0. It also has an odd parity and therefore odd orbital angular momentum l. Therefore, the lowest possible energy state has , .

The analysis just given is in fact only approximate, both because isospin is not an exact symmetry, and more importantly because the strong nuclear interaction between the two nucleons is related to angular momentum in spin–orbit interaction that mixes different s and l states. Parity is still constant in time so these do not mix with odd l states (such as). Since the total angular momentum j is also a good quantum number (it is a constant in time), both components must have the same j, and therefore . This is the total spin of the deuterium nucleus.

To summarize, the deuterium nucleus is antisymmetric in terms of isospin, and has spin 1 and even (+1) parity.

Magnetic and electric multipoles
In order to find theoretically the deuterium magnetic dipole moment μ, one uses the formula for a nuclear magnetic moment

with

g(l) and g(s) are g-factors of the nucleons.

Since the proton and neutron have different values for g(l) and g(s), one must separate their contributions. Each gets half of the deuterium orbital angular momentum  and spin . One arrives at

By using the same identities as here and using the value , we arrive at the following result, in units of the nuclear magneton μN

This suggests that the state of the deuterium is indeed to a good approximation ,  state, which occurs with both nucleons spinning in the same direction, but their magnetic moments subtracting because of the neutron's negative moment.

The electric dipole is zero as usual.

While the order of magnitude is reasonable, since the deuterium radius is of order of 1 femtometer (see below) and its electric charge is e, the above model does not suffice for its computation. More specifically, the electric quadrupole does not get a contribution from the l =0 state (which is the dominant one) and does get a contribution from a term mixing the l =0 and the l =2 states, because the electric quadrupole operator does not commute with angular momentum.

The latter contribution is dominant in the absence of a pure  contribution, but cannot be calculated without knowing the exact spatial form of the nucleons wavefunction inside the deuterium.

Higher magnetic and electric multipole moments cannot be calculated by the above model, for similar reasons.

Applications
Deuterium has a number of commercial and scientific uses. These include:

Nuclear reactors

Deuterium is used in heavy water moderated fission reactors, usually as liquid D2O, to slow neutrons without the high neutron absorption of ordinary hydrogen. This is a common commercial use for larger amounts of deuterium.

In research reactors, liquid D2 is used in cold sources to moderate neutrons to very low energies and wavelengths appropriate for scattering experiments.

Experimentally, deuterium is the most common nuclide used in nuclear fusion reactor designs, especially in combination with tritium, because of the large reaction rate (or nuclear cross section) and high energy yield of the D–T reaction. Commercial nuclear fusion is not yet an accomplished technology.

NMR spectroscopy

Deuterium is most commonly used in hydrogen nuclear magnetic resonance spectroscopy (proton NMR) in the following way. NMR ordinarily requires compounds of interest to be analyzed as dissolved in solution. Because of deuterium's nuclear spin properties which differ from the light hydrogen usually present in organic molecules, NMR spectra of hydrogen/protium are highly differentiable from that of deuterium, and in practice deuterium is not "seen" by an NMR instrument tuned for light-hydrogen. Deuterated solvents (including heavy water, but also compounds like deuterated chloroform, CDCl3) are therefore routinely used in NMR spectroscopy, in order to allow only the light-hydrogen spectra of the compound of interest to be measured, without solvent-signal interference.

Nuclear magnetic resonance spectroscopy can also be used to obtain information about the deuteron's environment in isotopically labelled samples (Deuterium NMR). For example, the configuration of hydrocarbon chains in lipid bilayers can be quantified using solid state deuterium NMR with deuterium-labelled lipid molecules.

Deuterium NMR spectra are especially informative in the solid state because of its relatively small quadrupole moment in comparison with those of bigger quadrupolar nuclei such as chlorine-35, for example.

Tracing

In chemistry, biochemistry and environmental sciences, deuterium is used as a non-radioactive, stable isotopic tracer, for example, in the doubly labeled water test. In chemical reactions and metabolic pathways, deuterium behaves somewhat similarly to ordinary hydrogen (with a few chemical differences, as noted). It can be distinguished from ordinary hydrogen most easily by its mass, using mass spectrometry or infrared spectrometry. Deuterium can be detected by femtosecond infrared spectroscopy, since the mass difference drastically affects the frequency of molecular vibrations; deuterium-carbon bond vibrations are found in spectral regions free of other signals.

Measurements of small variations in the natural abundances of deuterium, along with those of the stable heavy oxygen isotopes 17O and 18O, are of importance in hydrology, to trace the geographic origin of Earth's waters. The heavy isotopes of hydrogen and oxygen in rainwater (so-called meteoric water) are enriched as a function of the environmental temperature of the region in which the precipitation falls (and thus enrichment is related to mean latitude). The relative enrichment of the heavy isotopes in rainwater (as referenced to mean ocean water), when plotted against temperature falls predictably along a line called the global meteoric water line (GMWL). This plot allows samples of precipitation-originated water to be identified along with general information about the climate in which it originated. Evaporative and other processes in bodies of water, and also ground water processes, also differentially alter the ratios of heavy hydrogen and oxygen isotopes in fresh and salt waters, in characteristic and often regionally distinctive ways. The ratio of concentration of 2H to 1H is usually indicated with a delta as δ2H and the geographic patterns of these values are plotted in maps termed as isoscapes. Stable isotopes are incorporated into plants and animals and an analysis of the ratios in a migrant bird or insect can help suggest a rough guide to their origins.

Contrast properties
Neutron scattering techniques particularly profit from availability of deuterated samples: The H and D cross sections are very distinct and different in sign, which allows contrast variation in such experiments. Further, a nuisance problem of ordinary hydrogen is its large incoherent neutron cross section, which is nil for D. The substitution of deuterium atoms for hydrogen atoms thus reduces scattering noise.

Hydrogen is an important and major component in all materials of organic chemistry and life science, but it barely interacts with X-rays. As hydrogen (and deuterium) interact strongly with neutrons, neutron scattering techniques, together with a modern deuteration facility, fills a niche in many studies of macromolecules in biology and many other areas.

Nuclear weapons
This is discussed below. It is notable that although most stars, including the Sun, generate energy over most of their lives by fusing hydrogen into heavier elements, such fusion of light hydrogen (protium) has never been successful in the conditions attainable on Earth. Thus, all artificial fusion, including the hydrogen fusion that occurs in so-called hydrogen bombs, requires heavy hydrogen (either tritium or deuterium, or both) in order for the process to work.

Drugs

A deuterated drug is a small molecule medicinal product in which one or more of the hydrogen atoms contained in the drug molecule have been replaced by deuterium. Because of the kinetic isotope effect, deuterium-containing drugs may have significantly lower rates of metabolism, and hence a longer half-life. In 2017, deutetrabenazine became the first deuterated drug to receive FDA approval.

Reinforced essential nutrients
Deuterium can be used to reinforce specific oxidation-vulnerable C-H bonds within essential or conditionally essential nutrients, such as certain amino acids, or polyunsaturated fatty acids (PUFA), making them more resistant to oxidative damage. Deuterated polyunsaturated fatty acids, such as linoleic acid, slow down the chain reaction of lipid peroxidation that damage living cells. Deuterated ethyl ester of linoleic acid (RT001), developed by Retrotope, is in a compassionate use trial in infantile neuroaxonal dystrophy and has successfully completed a Phase I/II trial in Friedreich's ataxia.

Thermostabilization 
Live vaccines, such as the oral poliovirus vaccine, can be stabilized by deuterium, either alone or in combination with other stabilizers such as MgCl2.

Slowing circadian oscillations 
Deuterium has been shown to lengthen the period of oscillation of the circadian clock when dosed in rats, hamsters, and Gonyaulax dinoflagellates. In rats, chronic intake of 25% D2O disrupts circadian rhythmicity by lengthening the circadian period of suprachiasmatic nucleus-dependent rhythms in the brain's hypothalamus. Experiments in hamsters also support the theory that deuterium acts directly on the suprachiasmatic nucleus to lengthen the free-running circadian period.

History

Suspicion of lighter element isotopes
The existence of nonradioactive isotopes of lighter elements had been suspected in studies of neon as early as 1913, and proven by mass spectrometry of light elements in 1920. At that time the neutron had not yet been discovered, and the prevailing theory was that isotopes of an element differ by the existence of additional protons in the nucleus accompanied by an equal number of nuclear electrons. In this theory, the deuterium nucleus with mass two and charge one would contain two protons and one nuclear electron. Thus, hydrogen was thought to have no heavy isotopes.

Deuterium detected

It was first detected spectroscopically in late 1931 by Harold Urey, a chemist at Columbia University. The technique had previously been used to isolate heavy isotopes of neon. The cryogenic boiloff technique concentrated the fraction of the mass-2 isotope of hydrogen to a degree that made its spectroscopic identification unambiguous.

Naming of the isotope and Nobel Prize
Urey created the names protium, deuterium, and tritium in an article published in 1934. The name is based in part on advice from G. N. Lewis who had proposed the name "deutium". The name is derived from the Greek  ('second'), and the nucleus to be called "deuteron" or "deuton". Isotopes and new elements were traditionally given the name that their discoverer decided. Some British scientists, such as Ernest Rutherford, wanted the isotope to be called "diplogen", from the Greek  ('double'), and the nucleus to be called "diplon".

The amount inferred for normal abundance of this heavy isotope of hydrogen was so small (only about 1 atom in 6400 hydrogen atoms in ocean water (156 deuteriums per million hydrogens)) that it had not noticeably affected previous measurements of (average) hydrogen atomic mass. This explained why it hadn't been experimentally suspected before. Urey was able to concentrate water to show partial enrichment of deuterium. Lewis had prepared the first samples of pure heavy water in 1933. The discovery of deuterium, coming before the discovery of the neutron in 1932, was an experimental shock to theory, but when the neutron was reported, making deuterium's existence more explainable, deuterium won Urey the Nobel Prize in Chemistry in 1934. Lewis was embittered by being passed over for this recognition given to his former student.

"Heavy water" experiments in World War II

Shortly before the war, Hans von Halban and Lew Kowarski moved their research on neutron moderation from France to Britain, smuggling the entire global supply of heavy water (which had been made in Norway) across in twenty-six steel drums.

During World War II, Nazi Germany was known to be conducting experiments using heavy water as moderator for a nuclear reactor design. Such experiments were a source of concern because they might allow them to produce plutonium for an atomic bomb. Ultimately it led to the Allied operation called the "Norwegian heavy water sabotage", the purpose of which was to destroy the Vemork deuterium production/enrichment facility in Norway. At the time this was considered important to the potential progress of the war.

After World War II ended, the Allies discovered that Germany was not putting as much serious effort into the program as had been previously thought. The Germans had completed only a small, partly built experimental reactor (which had been hidden away) and had been unable to sustain a chain reaction. By the end of the war, the Germans did not even have a fifth of the amount of heavy water needed to run the reactor, partially due to the Norwegian heavy water sabotage operation. However, even if the Germans had succeeded in getting a reactor operational (as the U.S. did with Chicago Pile-1 in late 1942), they would still have been at least several years away from the development of an atomic bomb. The engineering process, even with maximal effort and funding, required about two and a half years (from first critical reactor to bomb) in both the U.S. and U.S.S.R., for example.

In thermonuclear weapons

The 62-ton Ivy Mike device built by the United States and exploded on 1 November 1952, was the first fully successful "hydrogen bomb" (thermonuclear bomb). In this context, it was the first bomb in which most of the energy released came from nuclear reaction stages that followed the primary nuclear fission stage of the atomic bomb. The Ivy Mike bomb was a factory-like building, rather than a deliverable weapon. At its center, a very large cylindrical, insulated vacuum flask or cryostat, held cryogenic liquid deuterium in a volume of about 1000 liters (160 kilograms in mass, if this volume had been completely filled). Then, a conventional atomic bomb (the "primary") at one end of the bomb was used to create the conditions of extreme temperature and pressure that were needed to set off the thermonuclear reaction.

Within a few years, so-called "dry" hydrogen bombs were developed that did not need cryogenic hydrogen. Released information suggests that all thermonuclear weapons built since then contain chemical compounds of deuterium and lithium in their secondary stages. The material that contains the deuterium is mostly lithium deuteride, with the lithium consisting of the isotope lithium-6. When the lithium-6 is bombarded with fast neutrons from the atomic bomb, tritium (hydrogen-3) is produced, and then the deuterium and the tritium quickly engage in thermonuclear fusion, releasing abundant energy, helium-4, and even more free neutrons. "Pure" fusion weapons such as the Tsar Bomba are believed to be obsolete. In most modern ("boosted") thermonuclear weapons, fusion directly provides only a small fraction of the total energy. Fission of a natural uranium U-238 tamper by fast neutrons produced from D-T fusion accounts for a much larger (i.e. boosted) energy release than the fusion reaction itself.

Modern research
In August 2018, scientists announced the transformation of gaseous deuterium into a liquid metallic form. This may help researchers better understand giant gas planets, such as Jupiter, Saturn and related exoplanets, since such planets are thought to contain a large quantity of liquid metallic hydrogen, which may be responsible for their observed powerful magnetic fields.

Antideuterium

An antideuteron is the antimatter counterpart of the nucleus of deuterium, consisting of an antiproton and an antineutron. The antideuteron was first produced in 1965 at the Proton Synchrotron at CERN and the Alternating Gradient Synchrotron at Brookhaven National Laboratory. A complete atom, with a positron orbiting the nucleus, would be called antideuterium, but  antideuterium has not yet been created.

See also 
Isotopes of hydrogen
Nuclear fusion
Tokamak
Tritium
Heavy water

References

External links 

 
 
 
 

Environmental isotopes
Isotopes of hydrogen
Neutron moderators
Nuclear fusion fuels
Nuclear materials
Subatomic particles with spin 1
Medical isotopes